The 2019 Motocross des Nations was a motocross race held on 28 September and 29 September 2019 at the Assen circuit, in The Netherlands. Motocross des Nations was last held in The Netherlands in 2004 but never at this venue.

France went into the event as the defending champions after taking their sixth title in 2018. However, it was The Netherlands who took victory in front of their home fans which marked the first Dutch win in the 73-year history of the event.

Entry list 
Start numbers are allocated based on the team finish from the previous year's edition. France are the reigning champions so they start with numbers 1, 2 and 3.

The official entry list was published on 3 September.

A total of 34 nations competed, up 4 from 2018. Canada, Venezuela, Argentina, Mexico, Guatemala, Philippines and Israel did not send teams after competing in 2018. Slovenia, Russia, Latvia, Croatia, Lithuania, Denmark, Luxembourg, Greece, Norway and Poland all returned for the first time since 2017, while Cyprus returned for the first time since 2009.

A number of teams made changes to their lineups before the publishing of the official entry list. 2015 MXGP world champion Romain Febvre was initially chosen to be #3 for France but had to be replaced by Jordi Tixier after breaking a femur at the MXGP of Sweden. In addition, Tom Vialle was originally chosen to be #2 for Team France, but was subsequently replaced by Maxime Renaux following a disagreement between Vialle and the French federation surrounding the wearing of apparel featuring a personal sponsor.

Neither Max Anstie or Ben Watson competed for Great Britain due to injuries sustained racing in the world championships. They were replaced by Enduro rider and sand specialist Nathan Watson and Adam Sterry. Mitchell Evans had to pull out of the event due to ongoing medical concerns, his place on Team Australia taken by 17-year old Regan Duffy. Henry Jacobi was initially confirmed as #26 for Germany, but had to be replaced by Simon Längenfelder after damaging a cruciate ligament.

Gustavo Pessoa had to withdraw from Team Brazil and was replaced by Pepe Bueno, whilst a hand injury picked up at the final grand prix of the year meant Arnaud Tonus was replaced by Cyrill Scheiwiller for Switzerland.Henrik Wahl was replaced by Cornelius Tøndel for Norway due to an illness.

Kawasaki declined to allow its factory riders Eli Tomac and Adam Cianciarulo to enter the competition.

Practice 
Practice is run on a class by class basis.

MXGP 

 Jason Anderson was docked 3 positions

MX2 

 Pepe Bueno was docked 2 positions

Open 

 Hugo Basaula was docked 14 positions.

Qualifying Races 
Qualifying is run on a class by class basis.
Top 19 countries after qualifying go directly to the main Motocross des Nations races. The remaining countries go to a smaller final.
Best 2 scores count.

MXGP

MX2

Open

Qualification Standings 

 Qualified Nations

 Nations Admitted to the B-Final

 None Qualified Nations

B-Final 
The B-Final is for the nations who finished 20th-32nd in qualifying. The top nation from the B-Final qualify for the Motocross des Nations races.
Best 2 scores for each nation counts.

Race

B-Final Standings 

 Ireland qualify for the Motocross des Nations races.

Motocross des Nations races 
The main Motocross des Nations races consist of 3 races which combine two classes together in each. Lowest score wins with each nation allowed to drop their worst score after the final race.

MXGP+MX2

Nations standings after Race 1

MX2+Open

Nations standings after Race 2

MXGP+Open

Nations standings after Race 3

Final standings

References 

Motocross des Nations
2019 in motorcycle sport